Public Defender is a 1917 silent film drama directed by Burton L. King with Frank Keenan.

Cast
Frank Keenan - Robert Murdock
Alma Hanlon - Mary Reed
Robert Edeson - Arthur Nelson
John St. Polis - David Moulton (*John Sainpolis)
Florence Short - Rose Moulton
Louis Stern - Leslie Morrison (Louis Sterns)
Tex La Grove - Walter Holmes
Harry Kingsley - Arthur Stevens
Helen Conwell - Queenie La Mar
James E. Sullivan - Father O'Malley (James Sullivan)
F. A. Cronin - James Whalon
John O'Keefe - John Hartley
John K. Roberts - 'Billy' Means (J. K. Roberts)

Preservation status
A copy of the film is preserved in a foreign archive.

References

External links

1917 films
American silent feature films
American black-and-white films
Films directed by Burton L. King
Silent American drama films
1917 drama films
1910s American films